The Düsseldorf Grand Prix originally called the Düsseldorf International was a men's tennis tournament played in Düsseldorf, Germany from 1968 until 1977.  The event was part of the Grand Prix tennis circuit and was held on outdoor clay courts.

Past finals

Singles

Doubles

See also
 Düsseldorf Open (ATP Tour)
 Düsseldorf Open (WTA Tour)

References

ATP results archive

Defunct tennis tournaments in Germany
Sports competitions in Düsseldorf
Grand Prix tennis circuit
Recurring sporting events established in 1968
Recurring sporting events disestablished in 1977
1968 establishments in West Germany
1977 disestablishments in West Germany